Robert or Bob Thompson may refer to:

Entertainment
Bobby Thompson (comedian) (1911–1988), English comedian
Bob Thompson (musician) (1924–2013), American orchestra leader, arranger, composer
Robert E. Thompson (screenwriter) (1924–2004), American screenwriter
Bob Thompson (wine) (born 1934), American wine writer
Robert Thompson (bassoonist), American bassoonist
Bob Thompson (painter) (1937–1966), American figurative painter
Robert Scott Thompson (born 1959), composer of ambient, instrumental and electroacoustic music
 Robert Livingstone Thompson, birth name of Dandy Livingstone (born 1943), British-Jamaican reggae musician and producer

Military
Robert G. Thompson (1915–1965), American World War II hero and Communist Party USA activist
Robert Grainger Ker Thompson (1916–1992), British soldier and counter-insurgency expert
Robert Means Thompson (1849–1930), American naval officer
Robert Thompson (spy) (born 1935), U.S. Air Force clerk and spy for the Soviet Union

Politics
Robert A. Thompson (1805–1876), American politician, U.S. Representative from Virginia
Robert F. Thompson (born 1971), American politician, Arkansas state senator
Robert J. Thompson (1937–2006), Pennsylvania State Senator
Robert Schuyler Thompson (1844–1930), businessman and politician in Manitoba, Canada
Robert Thompson (Mississippi politician) (b. 1830), Mississippi state Representative 
Robert Thompson (New Zealand politician) (1840–1922), New Zealand politician
Robert Thompson (Irish politician) (1839–1918), Member of Parliament for Belfast North, 1910–1918
Robert Thompson (Wisconsin politician) (1927–1999), American politician, Wisconsin state assemblyman
Robert N. Thompson (1914–1997), Canadian politician, chiropractor, and educator
Robert Adam Thompson (1860–1947), merchant, miller and politician in Ontario, Canada

Robert Townshend Thompson (1792-1887), Virginia politician, lawyer and slavery opponent

Sports
Robert Thompson (cyclist) (1884–1974), British Olympic road racing cyclist
Robert Thompson (footballer, born 1878), English footballer
Robert Thompson (rugby, born 1869) (1869–1952), Irish rugby union player
Robert Thompson (rugby union, born 1947), rugby union player who represented Australia
Robert Thompson (American football) (born 1960), American football linebacker
Robby Thompson (born 1962), baseball player
Robert Thompson (Australian footballer, born 1891) (1891–1918), Australian rules footballer for University
Robert Thompson (Australian footballer, born 1947), Australian rules footballer for Essendon
Robert Thompson (water polo) (born 1947), Canadian water polo player and coach
Robbie Thompson (born 1967), Australian rules footballer for Adelaide
Bob Thompson (footballer, born February 1890) (1890–1958), English football full back for Everton and others
Bob Thompson (footballer, born September 1890) (1890–1969), English football forward for numerous clubs

Others
Robert B. Thompson (1811–1841), Latter Day Saint leader, historian, and newspaper editor
Robert Thompson (designer) (1876–1955), British furniture maker
Robert E. Thompson (journalist) (1921–2003), political writer and Washington journalist
Robert Farris Thompson (born 1932), Yale University Professor and Master of Timothy Dwight College
Robert H. Thompson (1944–2017), British numismatist
Robert Thompson (media scholar) (born 1959), American media historian
Robert Thompson (chef) (born 1981), Michelin starred chef
Robert Thompson (born 1982), one of the perpetrators in the murder of James Bulger
Robert Thompson (poker director), American poker official in Las Vegas
Robert Thompson (priest), Dean of Ardfert from 1959 until 1966

See also
Bobby Thompson (disambiguation)
Bert Thompson (disambiguation)
Robert Thomson (disambiguation)